Montrell Washington (born March 14, 1999) is an American football wide receiver for the Denver Broncos of the National Football League (NFL). He played college football at Samford.

Professional career

Washington was drafted by the Denver Broncos in the fifth round, 162nd overall, of the 2022 NFL Draft.

Notes

References

External links
Denver Broncos bio
  Samford Bulldogs bio

1999 births
Living people
People from Canton, Georgia
Players of American football from Georgia (U.S. state)
American football wide receivers
Samford Bulldogs football players
Denver Broncos players